Jani Likavec (born 10 March 1968) is a Slovenian male handball player. He was a member of the Slovenia men's national handball team. He was part of the  team at the 2000 Summer Olympics, playing seven matches. On club level he played for Trimo Trebnje in Trebnje.

References

1968 births
Living people
Slovenian male handball players
Handball players at the 2000 Summer Olympics
Olympic handball players of Slovenia
People from Trebnje